The Las Vegas Raiderettes are the cheerleading squad for the Las Vegas Raiders professional American football team. They were established in 1961 as the Oakland Raiderettes. When the Raiders moved to Los Angeles in 1982, the cheerleading squad  became known as the Los Angeles Raiderettes. When the franchise moved back to Oakland in 1995, the Raiderettes changed their name back to the Oakland Raiderettes and when the franchise moved to Las Vegas in 2020 they became the Las Vegas Raiderettes. In Los Angeles, Oakland, and Las Vegas they have been billed as "Football's Fabulous Females".

Upon the move of the team to Las Vegas, a new 20,000 square foot studio was constructed for the Raiderettes in Henderson in between the Raiders headquarters and practice facility and the practice facility of the Las Vegas Aces of the WNBA.

Lawsuit
In 2017, a class-action lawsuit brought by the Raiderettes against the Raiders was settled for $1.25 million. The suit, brought in 2014 by 90 cheerleaders, was the first case in the NFL to claim wage theft and other violations of labor law were being perpetrated on the cheer squad by the Raiders franchise. Cheerleaders for other NFL teams followed with similar wage theft lawsuits after the success of the Raiderette case.

Notable former cheerleaders
A number of former cheerleaders have found success outside the organization
 
 Anjanette Abayari – model, and actress in the Philippines
 Emily Compagno – legal analyst.
 Anjelah Johnson – stand-up comedian and former MADtv cast member
 Cheryl Moana Marie Nunes – "Bond Girl" (Nightfire), television presenter, singer
 Kiana Tom, TV fitness instructor, Bench Warmer model, actress
 Nicole Rodrigues, American CEO

References

External links

Las Vegas Raiderettes official website

National Football League cheerleading squads
Las Vegas Raiders personnel
Performing groups established in 1961
1961 establishments in California
Dance in Nevada
History of women in California
History of women in Nevada